Krzysztof Krawczyk (born 28 January 1962 in Wałbrzych) is a Polish former high jumper. He represented his country at the 1988 Summer Olympics as well as one outdoor and two indoor World Championships. In addition he was the European Junior Champion in 1981.

His personal bests in the event are 2.32 metres outdoors (Lublin 1988) and 2.30 metres indoors (Budapest 1987).

International competitions

References

1962 births
Living people
Polish male high jumpers
Olympic athletes of Poland
Athletes (track and field) at the 1988 Summer Olympics
People from Wałbrzych
World Athletics Championships athletes for Poland
Competitors at the 1987 Summer Universiade